Beyond Oblivion is a 1956 Argentine drama film directed by Hugo del Carril, starring Laura Hidalgo and del Carril. It tells the story of a man who has lost the woman he loved and tries to turn another woman into her. The screenplay is loosely based on the novel Bruges-la-Morte by Georges Rodenbach.

Cast
 Laura Hidalgo as Blanca de Arellano / Mónica
 Hugo del Carril as Fernando de Arellano
 Eduardo Rudy as Luis Marcel, alias Mauricio Pontier
 Gloria Ferrandiz as Sabina, ama de llaves
 Ricardo Galache as Médico professor Santillán
 Pedro Laxalt as Médico doctor Don Álvaro,
 Francisco López Silva as Esteban, mayordomo
 Ricardo de Rosas as Bernabé, cochero
 Víctor Martucci as Médico amigo del profesor Santillán
 Lili Gacel as Herminia, mucama

Release
The film was released theatrically in Argentina on 14 June 1956.

References

1956 films
Argentine drama films
Films based on Belgian novels
Films directed by Hugo del Carril
1950s Spanish-language films
1956 drama films
Argentine black-and-white films
1950s Argentine films